Tarzymiechy Trzecie  is a village in the administrative district of Gmina Izbica, within Krasnystaw County, Lublin Voivodeship, in eastern Poland.

The village has a population of 430.

References

Tarzymiechy Trzecie